Michael McDermott may refer to:

Michael McDermott (musician), Chicago folk-rock singer
Michael McDermott (drummer), formerly of punk rock band The Bouncing Souls, as of 2021 of Joan Jett And The Blackhearts
Michael McDermott (baseball) (1864–1947), 19th-century baseball pitcher
 Michael McDermott, software engineer who committed the Wakefield massacre
Michael McDermott (politician), Libertarian gubernatorial candidate for New York in 2014
Michael McDermott, actor in the 1979 film Starting Over
Michael J. McDermott, American diplomat

See also
 Mike McDermott (disambiguation)